
The Salem Social Library (1760-1810) or Social Library in Salem was a proprietary library in Salem, Massachusetts. "Twenty-eight gentlemen ... subscribed 165 guineas. ... A Boston minister, [Jeremy Condy], was employed to buy the books in London and the library opened in a brick schoolhouse May 20, 1761, with 415 volumes including gifts given by members. The revolution was a bitter blow to many of the gentlemen who had founded the library. Many of the proprietors fled to England. ... In 1784 the library made a new start in new quarters in the new ... schoolhouse. Here they remained about 15 years, the schoolmaster acting as librarian." "In 1797 they became incorporated;" Edward Augustus Holyoke, Jacob Ashton, Joseph Hiller, and Edward Pulling served as signatories. "There were over 40 proprietors when in 1810 the library was turned over to the [Salem] Athenaeum."

Subscribers

 Samuel Barnard
 Thomas Barnard
 Samuel Barton Jr.
 Joseph Blaney
 Joseph Bowditch
 William Browne
 Francis Cabot
 Joseph Cabot
 S. Curwen
 Richard Derby
 William Eppes
 Samuel Gardner
 Samuel Gardner Jr.
 Stephen Higginson
 E.A. Holyoke
 William Jeffry
 Daniel King
 John Nutting Jr.
 A. Oliver Jr.
 Timothy Orne
 Benjamin Pickman
 Benjamin Pickman Jr.
 Ebenezer Putnam
 William Pynchon
 Nathaniel Ropes
 William Vans
 W. Walter

See also
 Salem Athenaeum, successor to the Social Library of Salem

References

Further reading
 Bylaws and regulations of the incorporated proprietors of the Social Library in Salem. 1797. (Includes catalog)
 By-laws and regulations of the Proprietors of the Social Library in Salem ; with a Catalogue of the books belonging to the Library by Proprietors of the Social Library in Salem. Salem: Printed by Thomas C. Cushing, 1809.
 "The Social Library."

External links
 Phillips Library, Peabody Essex Museum. Records of the Social Library, 1760-1810.

1761 establishments in Massachusetts
1810 disestablishments in the United States
Libraries in Essex County, Massachusetts
History of Salem, Massachusetts
Subscription libraries in the United States